Division No. 15 is one of eighteen census divisions in the province of Saskatchewan, Canada, as defined by Statistics Canada. It is located in the north-central part of the province. The most populous community in this division is Prince Albert.

Demographics 

Census subdivisions 
The following census subdivisions (municipalities or municipal equivalents) are located within Saskatchewan's Division No. 15.

Cities
Humboldt
Prince Albert
Melfort

Towns
Aberdeen
Birch Hills
Bruno
Cudworth
Duck Lake
Hague
Kinistino
Rosthern
St. Brieux
Vonda
Wakaw
Waldheim

Villages

Albertville
Alvena
Annaheim
Beatty
Christopher Lake
Englefeld
Hepburn
Laird
Lake Lenore
Meath Park
Middle Lake
Muenster
Paddockwood
Pilger
Prud'Homme
St. Benedict
St. Gregor
St. Louis
Weirdale
Weldon

Resort villages
Candle Lake
Wakaw Lake

Rural municipalities

 RM No. 369 St. Peter
 RM No. 370 Humboldt
 RM No. 371 Bayne
 RM No. 372 Grant
 RM No. 373 Aberdeen
 RM No. 399 Lake Lenore
 RM No. 400 Three Lakes
 RM No. 401 Hoodoo
 RM No. 402 Fish Creek
 RM No. 403 Rosthern
 RM No. 404 Laird
 RM No. 429 Flett's Springs
 RM No. 430 Invergordon
 RM No. 431 St. Louis
 RM No. 459 Kinistino
 RM No. 460 Birch Hills
 RM No. 461 Prince Albert
 RM No. 463 Duck Lake
 RM No. 490 Garden River
 RM No. 491 Buckland
 RM No. 520 Paddockwood
 RM No. 521 Lakeland

Reserves

 Beardy's 97 and Okemasis 96
 Beardy's and Okemasis 96 & 97-B
 Chief Joseph Custer
 Cumberland 100A
 James Smith 100
 Little Red River 106C
 Montreal Lake 106B
 Muskoday Reserve
 One Arrow 95
 One Arrow 95-1A
 One Arrow 95-1C
 One Arrow 95-1D
 Wahpaton 94A

References

Division No. 15, Saskatchewan Statistics Canada

 
15